Paul Noworyta is an American professional vert skater who became the first and only athlete in the world to compete on the pro vert circuit after receiving a kidney transplant at the Cleveland Clinic in Ohio on September 6, 1989. Noworyta started riding vert ramps in 1983 and later became the oldest rookie pro the sport had ever seen at age 33. He wrote a book about his life in 2006 called "Transplant to Handplant" and is an outspoken kidney transplant advocate. He now operates the website KidneysAreSexy.com. His favorite tricks on vert are McTwist 540, big disaster inverts, and backflips.

Vert Competitions 
2003 LG Action Sports World Championships Los Angeles, CA Vert: 13th 
2003 NBC Gravity Games Cleveland, OH – Vert: 12th
2003 Mobile Skatepark Series Buffalo, NY – Vert: 9th
2003 Mobile Skatepark Series Cincinnati, OH – Vert: 10th
2002 ASA World Championships Los Angeles, CA – Vert: 4th

References

External links
bookstore.iuniverse.com
books.google.com
books.google.com
geocities.ws
tecnoseek.eu
highrollaz.org

1972 births
Living people
Vert skaters
X Games athletes